Brandon Fleming may refer to:
 Brandon Fleming (writer)
 Brandon Fleming (footballer)